The following highways are numbered 462:

Canada
Manitoba Provincial Road 462
Newfoundland and Labrador Route 462

Japan
 Japan National Route 462

United States
  Indiana State Road 462
  Kentucky Route 462
  Maryland Route 462
  Montana Secondary Highway 462
  Pennsylvania Route 462
  Puerto Rico Highway 462
  South Carolina Highway 462
  Tennessee State Route 462
  Texas State Highway Loop 462 (former)